Lampetis fastuosa is a jewel beetle of the family Buprestidae.

Description
The basic colour is bright metallic bluish green. The head is rugose and the elytra are convex, with rows of distinct punctations. This species is considered a destructive insect. In India it defoliates the young shoots and gnaws the bark of Acacia nilotica and Acacia catechu (Mimosaceae).

Distribution
This species can be found in southern India.

References

 Stebbing, E.P  The bark-eating and root-boring beetles (Coelosterna scabrata, F., and Psiloptera fastuosa, F.) OF THE BABUL (Acacia arabica) - Superintendent Government Printing, India

External links
 Lampetis fastuosa on Gorodinski
 Biolib
 Zipcodezoo
 Universal Biological Indexer

Beetles of Asia
Buprestidae
Beetles described in 1775
Taxa named by Johan Christian Fabricius